Ptilium is a genus of mosses with very broad worldwide occurrence. This genus is within the family Hypnaceae, in the class Bryopsida, subclass Bryidae and order Hypnales.

Ecology
Some of these species occur on the floor of Canadian boreal forests; an example of this occurrence is within the black spruce/feathermoss climax forest, often having moderately dense canopy and featuring a forest floor of feathermosses including, according to Hogan, Hylocomium splendens, Pleurozium schreberi and Ptilium crista-castrensis.

See also
 Feather moss

References

Hypnaceae
Moss genera